Fire Works is the third album by the New Zealand post-rock band High Dependency Unit. It was released in New Zealand in March 2001. HDU had supported Steve Albini's band Shellac on a tour of New Zealand, and the album was recorded at Albini's studio in Chicago, but with Albini otherwise engaged production was handled by Dale Cotton.

The album received a four-star rating from Allmusic, who were most impressed by the slower tracks.

Track listing
 "Visionson"  – 2:09
 "Joyd"  – 4:30
 "The 3 Second Rule"  – 5:04
 "Giant Overpasses"  – 6:20
 "Sarsparilla"  – 4:32
 "Schallblüte"  – 3:42
 "Now Here"  – 6:45
 "Parfum"  – 4:23
 "Concentricity"  – 6:20

References

2001 albums
High Dependency Unit albums
Flying Nun Records albums